These are the Group F Standings and Results:

Standings

Results/Fixtures

All times given below are in Central European Time.

Game 1
November 6, 2007

Game 2
November 13, 2007

Game 3
November 20, 2007

Game 4
November 27, 2007

Game 5
December 4, 2007

Game 6
December 11, 2007

Game 7
December 18, 2007

Game 8
January 8, 2008

Game 9
January 15, 2008

{{basketballbox|bg=#eee|date=January 15|place=Moscow|time=18:15
|teamA= Dynamo Moscow  |scoreA=107
|teamB=  Panellinios GS |scoreB=73
|Q1=40-20|Q2=17-24|Q3=24-12|Q4=26'-17
}}

Game 10January 22, 2008''

External links

2007–08 ULEB Cup